Michael Meert (born 1953 in Bonn, Germany) is a German film author and director. He is the grandson of the Flemish politician and writer Leo Meert and the bohemian violinist Stephanie Prinz.

Life and work 
From 1976 to 1981 Michael Meert studied at the German Film and Television Academy Berlin (dffb), where he met Andrei Tarkovsky, Joris Ivens and Johan van der Keuken. Later he attended the Masterclass of Edvard Bernstein−Zebrowski and Krzysztof Kieslowski for three years. Along with many others, he founded the “Video-Movement” and worked on a great number of videos within the “grass-roots movement” of video art.
After his highly acclaimed feature film “Krieg der Töne” (ZDF, 1988) he worked along the border between documentary and video art and now he devotes his work mainly to TV movies with a highly poetic style for a broader public.

Filmography (selection) 
 2012: Alle Menschen werden Brüder. Die Freimaurer und die Musik
 2010: Die 12 langen Jahre
 2009: Die hängenden Gärten von Cordoba
 2008: Musikalische Reise - Beethoven in Bonn
 2007: Vom schönen leben
 2007: Der junge Beethoven
 2007: Das Geheimnis des Dritten Tores
 2005: Jordi Savall oder wie die Indianer sich in die Barockmusik einschlichen
 2005: Eine Baltische Reise-Gidon Kremer
 2004: Der Flamenco Clan/Herencia Flamenca
 2003: Pablo Casals, ein Musiker verlangt eine bessere Welt
 2000: Bad Boy of Music
 1999: Violin Up!-Isaac Stern
 1996: Iberia - Die Isaac Albéniz Story
 1995: Paco de Lucía. Light and Shade
 1993: Manuel de Falla und Federico García Lorca
 1989: Der Tod des Maurice Ravel
 1987: Krieg der Töne
 1984: Nahtstellen

External links 
 http://www.michaelmeert.de official Homepage
 
 German Film and Television Academy Berlin
 German Wikipedia: Michael Meert
 Spanish Wikipedia: Michael Meert

References
 WorldCat, http://www.worldcat.org
 This article was created parting from the translation of the article Michael Meert in German under the licence of Creative-Commons-License and GFDL.

German documentary filmmakers
Mass media people from Bonn
1953 births
Living people
Film people from North Rhine-Westphalia